Antrim railway station (Great Northern) served Antrim in County Antrim, Northern Ireland. It was located on the mothballed Lisburn-Antrim railway line. The town is now served by Antrim railway station.

History

Built by the Dublin and Antrim Junction Railway, it became part of the Great Northern Railway (Ireland) .  In 1958 it passed to the Ulster Transport Authority.  The UTA closed the station two years later.

The site today

Currently, the line between Antrim and Lisburn is only used for training and emergency diversions, however it could be revived under plans to operate a Belfast - Lisburn - Antrim - Belfast circular route. Any traffic would use the current Antrim station.

References 

 
 

Disused railway stations in County Antrim
Railway stations opened in 1871
Railway stations closed in 1960
Railway stations in Northern Ireland opened in the 19th century